Alexandrovka is a rural locality in Novoposelenovsky Selsoviet Rural Settlement, Kursky District, Kursk Oblast, Russia. Population:

Geography 
The village is located 76 km from the Russia–Ukraine border, 15 km south-west of Kursk, 5 km from the selsoviet center – 1st Tsvetovo.

 Climate
Alexandrovka has a warm-summer humid continental climate (Dfb in the Köppen climate classification).

Transport 
Alexandrovka is located 1.5 km from the federal route  Crimea Highway (a part of the European route ), 1 km from the road of regional importance  ("Crimea Highway" – Ivanino, part of the European route ), on the road of intermunicipal significance  (38K-010 – Alexandrovka), 5 km from the nearest railway halt and passing loop 454 km (railway line Lgov I — Kursk).

The rural locality is situated 24 km from Kursk Vostochny Airport, 111 km from Belgorod International Airport and 220 km from Voronezh Peter the Great Airport.

References

Notes

Sources

Rural localities in Kursky District, Kursk Oblast